Alan Morrison may refer to:

 Alan Morrison (poet) (born 1974), British poet
 Alan Morrison (organist), American musician
 Alan Morrison (lawyer), American Supreme Court litigator, co-founder of Public Citizen
 Alan Morrison (racing driver) (born 1971), British race-car driver
 Alan Morrison (general) (1927–2008), Major General in the Australian Army
 Alan Morrison (politician) , member of the Indiana House of Representatives

See also
 Allan Morrison (disambiguation)